Alexander Thompson may refer to:
 Alexander Thompson (VC) (1824–1880), Scottish recipient of the Victoria Cross
 Alexander Thompson (cricketer, born 1876) (1876–1951), English cricketer for Northamptonshire
 Alexander M. Thompson (1861–1948), German-born English journalist and dramatist
 Alexander John Thompson, author of a table of logarithms, published in 1952
 Alec Thompson (1916–2001), English cricketer for Middlesex
 Alex Thompson (rugby league) (born 1990), rugby league footballer
 Alex Thompson (footballer) (1917–2002), footballer for Tranmere Rovers

See also
 Alexander Thomson (disambiguation)